Edith Daggett Rockwood (born 1884) was an American writer.

Early life
Edith Daggett was born in Klamath Falls, Oregon, in 1884, the daughter of Morris Henry and Rose Daggett, descendants of the colonial Putnam family. Morris Henry Daggett was a Klamath Falls pioneer. In 1932 he left Oregon to live with his daughter at Berkeley, California, where he died and is buried. He arrived to Klamath Falls from Redding, California, in 1883. He was born in New York state. He operated a drug store at Fifth and Main Streets, Klamath Falls.

Career
Edith Daggett Rockwood contributed to Arizona newspapers and was a magazine writer.

She is the author of a collection of poems.

While a bookkeeper in the Yuma National bank, she organized the Business and Professional Women's Club in Yuma, Arizona.

She was the organizer of Pioneer's Club of Arizona.

She was a member of Woman's Athletic Club of Alameda County, Oakland, California, National League of American Pen Women.

Personal life
Edith Daggett married G. H. Rockwood and they had two children: George Rockwood and Hawley McGee.

She lived at 2236 Haste St., Berkeley, California.

References

1884 births
American women writers
People from Klamath Falls, Oregon
Year of death missing